MTV Party To Go Volume 3 was the third album in the MTV Party To Go series.  The album was certified Gold on December 6, 1993, by the RIAA.

Track listing
 "Baby Got Back" (Album Version) – Sir Mix-a-Lot
 "Finally" (12" Choice Mix) – CeCe Peniston
 "Deeper and Deeper" (David's Klub Mix) – Madonna
 "I'm Too Sexy" (Extended Club Mix) – Right Said Fred
 "Real Love" (Hip Hop Mix) – Mary J. Blige
 "Jump Around" (Blood Stain Remix) – House of Pain
 "I Got a Man" (Ultimix Remix) – Positive K
 "Come & Talk To Me" (Radio Remix) – Jodeci
 "Mr. Loverman" (D.M. Ragga Hop Mix) – Shabba Ranks
 "End of the Road" (LP Version) – Boyz II Men

References

MTV series albums
1993 compilation albums
Dance music compilation albums
Tommy Boy Records compilation albums